American actress Lisa Kudrow has been honored with numerous accolades over her career. For her role in the sitcom Friends, she received six nominations at the Primetime Emmy Awards, winning in 1998 for Outstanding Supporting Actress in a Comedy Series, she won two Screen Actors Guild Awards, one Satellite Award, one American Comedy award and one TV Guide award.

Major associations

Emmy Awards

Primetime Emmy Awards
The Primetime Emmy Award is an American award bestowed by the Academy of Television Arts & Sciences (ATAS) in recognition of excellence in American primetime television programming. Kudrow has received one award from fifteen nominations.

Children's and Family Emmy Awards
The Children's and Family Emmy Awards are bestowed by the National Academy of Television Arts and Sciences in recognition of excellence in American children's and family-oriented television programming. Kudrow has received one nomination.

Golden Globe Awards
The Golden Globe Awards are accolades bestowed by the 93 members of the Hollywood Foreign Press Association beginning in January 1944, recognizing excellence in film and television, both domestic and foreign. Kudrow has received one nomination.

Screen Actors Guild Awards
The Screen Actors Guild Awards are accolades given by the Screen Actors Guild‐American Federation of Television and Radio Artists to recognize outstanding performances in film and prime time television. Kudrow has received two awards from twelve nominations.

Other awards

American Comedy Awards
The American Comedy Awards are a group of awards presented annually in the United States recognizing performances and performers in the field of comedy, with an emphasis on television comedy and comedy films. Kudrow has received one award from eight nominations.

Banff Rockie Awards
The Banff World Media Festival is an international media event held in the Canadian Rockies at the Fairmont Banff Springs Hotel in Banff, Alberta, Canada. The festival is dedicated to world television and digital content and its creation and development. The festival features an international program competition, the Banff Rockie Awards, which are broadcast on CBC. Kudrow has received one award.

Blockbuster Entertainment Awards
The Blockbuster Entertainment Awards were a film awards ceremony, founded by Blockbuster Inc., that ran from 1995 until 2001. Kudrow received one award.

Chicago Film Critics Association Awards
The Chicago Film Critics Association is an association of professional film critics, who work in print, broadcast and online media, based in Chicago, Illinois, United States. Kudrow has received one nomination.

Chlotrudis Awards
The Chlotrudis Awards are American film awards given since 1995 by the Chlotrudis Society for Independent Film. They are considered among the most important awards of international independent cinema. Kudrow has received one award.

Critics' Choice Television Awards
The Critics' Choice Television Awards are accolades that are presented annually by the Broadcast Television Journalists Association. Kudrow has received two nominations.

Dorian Awards
The Dorian Awards are an annual endeavor organized by GALECA: The Society of LGBTQ Entertainment Critics (founded in 2009 as the Gay and Lesbian Entertainment Critics Association). Kudrow has received one award.

Golden Raspberry Awards
The Golden Raspberry Awards (also known as the Razzie Awards) is a mock award in recognition of the worst in film. Kudrow has received one nomination.

Gracie Awards
The Gracie Awards are awards presented by the Alliance for Women in Media Foundation in America, to celebrate and honor programming created for women, by women, and about women, as well as individuals who have made exemplary contributions in electronic media and affiliates. Kudrow has received one award.

Independent Spirit Awards
The Independent Spirit Awards, founded in 1984, are awards dedicated to independent filmmakers. Kudrow has received one nomination.

MTV Movie and TV Awards
The MTV Movie & TV Awards (formerly known as the MTV Movie Awards) is a film and television awards show presented annually on MTV. Kudrow has received one nomination.

National Society of Film Critics Awards
The National Society of Film Critics is an American film critic organization. The organization is known for its highbrow tastes, and its annual awards are one of the most prestigious film critics awards in the United States. Kudrow has received one nomination.

New York Film Critics Circle Awards
The New York Film Critics Circle is an American film critic organization founded in 1935. Its membership includes over 30 film critics from New York-based daily and weekly newspapers, magazines, online publications. Kudrow has received one award.

Nickelodeon Kids' Choice Awards
The Nickelodeon Kids' Choice Awards is an American 90-minute-long annual awards show that airs on Nickelodeon. Usually held on a Saturday day, morning, or night in late March or early April, the show that honors the year's biggest television, movie, and music acts as voted by Nickelodeon viewers. Kudrow has received one nomination.

Online Film Critics Society Awards
The Online Film Critics Society is an international professional association of online film journalists, historians and scholars who publish their work on the World Wide Web. Kudrow has received one nomination.

People Magazine Awards
The People Magazine Awards was a one-off American awards ceremony that aired on December 18, 2014. Kudrow received one award.

Satellite Awards
The Satellite Awards are annual awards given by the International Press Academy that are commonly noted in entertainment industry journals and blogs. Kudrow has received one award from five nominations.

Teen Choice Awards
The Teen Choice Awards is an annual awards show that airs on the Fox television network. The awards honor the year's biggest achievements in music, film, sports, television, fashion, and more, voted by viewers aged 13 to 19. Kudrow has received one award from three nominations.

The Stinkers Bad Movie Awards
The Stinkers Bad Movie Awards (formerly known as the Hastings Bad Cinema Society) was a Los Angeles-based group of film buffs and movie critics devoted to honoring the worst films of the year. Kudrow received four nominations.

Streamy Awards
The Streamy Awards, often referred to as the Streamys, are presented annually by Dick Clark Productions and Tubefilter to recognize and honor excellence in online video, including directing, acting, producing and writing. Kudrow has received two nominations.

TV Guide Awards
The TV Guide Award was an annual award created by the editors of TV Guide magazine, as a readers poll to honor outstanding programs and performers in the American television industry. The awards were presented until 1964. The TV Guide Award was revived 1999–2001. Kudrow received one award from two nominations.

Viewers for Quality Television Awards
Viewers for Quality Television was an American nonprofit organization founded in 1984 to advocate network television series that members of the organization voted to be of the "highest quality". Kudrow received one nomination for their Q Award.

Webby Awards
A Webby Award is an award for excellence on the Internet presented annually by The International Academy of Digital Arts and Sciences, a judging body composed of over two thousands industry experts and technology innovators. Kudrow has received four awards from seven nominations.

Notes

References

External links
 
 

Kudrow, Lisa